The 2016 Paul Hunter Classic was a professional ranking snooker tournament that took place between 24 and 28 August 2016 at the Stadthalle in Fürth, Germany. It was the fourth ranking event of the 2016/2017 season.

Named in honour of former professional snooker player Paul Hunter, this was the first time for which the event was a ranking tournament, having previously been a minor-ranking event of the Players Tour Championship. It was also the first of the two ranking events of the season, along with the Gibraltar Open (also a former European Tour event), which would be open to amateurs and would form the new Amateur Order of Merit.

Ali Carter was the defending champion, but he was defeated 3–4 by Yan Bingtao in the last 32.

Thepchaiya Un-Nooh made the 119th official maximum break in the second frame of his last 32 match against Kurt Maflin. It was Un-Nooh's first professional maximum break, having missed the final black on two occasions the previous season.

Mark Selby won his 8th ranking title, defeating Tom Ford 4–2 in the final.

Prize fund

The breakdown of prize money for this year is shown below:

 Winner: €25,000
 Runner-up: €12,000
 Semi-final: €6,000
 Quarter-final: €4,000
 Last 16: €2,300
 Last 32: €1,200
 Last 64: €700

 Non-televised highest break: €
 Televised highest break: €
 Total: €125,000

The "rolling 147 prize" for a maximum break stood at £40,000.

Main rounds

Top half

Section 1

Section 2

Section 3

Section 4

Bottom half

Section 5

Section 6

Section 7

Section 8

Finals

Final

Amateur pre-qualifying
These matches were played in Fürth on 24–25 August 2016. All matches were best of 7 frames.

Round 1

Round 2

Round 3

Century breaks

Amateur pre-qualifying stage centuries

 119  Kishan Hirani
 109  Gerard Greene
 106, 104  Andy Hicks

 106  Ashley Hugill
 105  Ian Glover

Televised stage centuries

 147, 141, 120  Thepchaiya Un-Nooh
 136, 128, 120, 102, 101  Tom Ford
 136, 106  Michael Holt
 132, 116  Liang Wenbo
 132  Zhou Yuelong
 127  Mark Selby
 123  Zhao Xintong
 121  Ali Carter
 120, 101, 100  Mark Allen
 120  Matthew Stevens
 118, 110  Kurt Maflin
 118, 105  David Gilbert

 112  Joe Swail
 111  Li Hang
 110  Dominic Dale
 109  Andrew Higginson
 107  Zack Richardson
 104  Robbie Williams
 104  Jack Lisowski
 104  Martin O'Donnell
 104  Mark Davis
 101  Mei Xiwen
 100  Fergal O'Brien

References

2016
2016 in snooker
2016 in German sport
August 2016 sports events in Germany